Sheet pizza (also called sheet pan pizza) is any thin-crust style pizza baked on a baking sheet. It is typically rectangular (like the sheet), cut in square or rectangular slices, and served for a family meal or at an event with a large number of people.

References

Pizza styles